Reverend Ambrose I. Lane Sr. (February 12, 1935 – September 14, 2010) was an American anti-poverty activist, radio talk show personality and political and religious commentator.

Early life and education

The Knoxville, Tennessee native had a masters in social work from the University of Pittsburgh in 1963.

Program

His program, "We Ourselves", aired from 1978 until his death on the Pacifica Foundation’s WPFW-FM, a 50,000 watt station in the nation’s capitol. He also hosted a similar show on XM 169 The Power, now the SiriusXM 126, from March 2006 until July 26, 2007.

He used his knowledge of law and people to co-anchored gavel-to-gavel coverage of U.S. Supreme Court confirmation hearings and Pacifica’s daily national six weeks live coverage of the Persian Gulf War.

He managed the Pacific Foundation from 2005 to 2006 - as well as other human services agencies. In 2005 Lane signed (for Pacific Foundation) a 15 year lease with Empire State Realty for tower transmission for WBAI.

Writings

His 1982 essay, "Where Are Your Responsible White Leaders?", made a splash when it was published in The Washington Post. "Frankly, blacks are tired of carrying the overwhelmingly disproportionate share of the responsibility for preserving freedom and extending democracy in America," he wrote. "And we are sick and tired of being your favorite scapegoats whenever your irresponsible, greedy leaders rip you off."

The publisher of numerous books and pamphlets, he was a founder, part owner, editor and publisher and Board Chair of the Buffalo New York Challenger, serving Buffalo, Rochester, and Syracuse, New York.

He also created the National Center’s Department of Research and Development's publications The National Center Reporter and New Spirit. Lane’s most recent book was “For Whites Only? How and Why America Became A Racist Nation” was published in 1999.

He was a recipient of the United Black Fund’s Media Excellence Award “for 20 Years of Outstanding Service to the Community Through Superb Journalism.”

References

Ambrose Lane Sr., anti-poverty activist and radio host, dies at 75

External links
Ambrose Lane's official website

1935 births
2010 deaths
People from Knoxville, Tennessee
University of Pittsburgh School of Social Work alumni
American activists
American talk radio hosts
Radio personalities from Washington, D.C.
African-American television personalities
African-American radio personalities
American infotainers
American male journalists
American political commentators
American political writers
21st-century African-American people
20th-century African-American people